"No Harm Is Done" is a song by French singer and songwriter Christine and the Queens featuring vocals from Tunji Ige. It was released as a digital download on 8 September 2015 as the lead single from the English edition of his debut studio album, Christine and the Queens (2015).

Music video
A music video to accompany the release of "No Harm Is Done" was released onto YouTube on September 23, 2015 at a total length of three minutes and fifty-two seconds.

Track listing

Charts

Release history

References

2015 singles
2015 songs
Christine and the Queens songs
Because Music singles
Songs written by Héloïse Letissier